Naman Tanwar (born 25 September 1998) is an Indian boxer who started boxing under Vishnu Bhagwan(Coach) in Bheem Stadium, Haryana. He did his schooling from Bhiwani Public School, Bhiwani.

He won a bronze medal in commonwealth games  held at Gold Coast, Queensland.

Boxing career 

Professional record summary

References

External links
 
 

Indian male boxers
Commonwealth Games medallists in boxing
Commonwealth Games bronze medallists for India
1998 births
Living people
Boxers at the 2018 Commonwealth Games
Heavyweight boxers
Medallists at the 2018 Commonwealth Games